France competed at the 2022 Mediterranean Games held in Oran, Algeria from 25 June to 6 July 2022.

Medalists

| width="78%" align="left" valign="top" |

Archery

France won three medals in archery.

Artistic gymnastics

France competed in artistic gymnastics.

Athletics

France won 13 medals in athletics.

Basketball

France won the gold medal in the men's tournament and the silver medal in the women's tournament.

Boules

France won three gold medals in boules.

Boxing

France won seven medals in boxing.

Cycling

France competed in cycling.

Fencing

France won two medals in fencing.

Football

France won the football tournament.

Judo

France won seven medals in judo.

Karate

France won one medal in karate: Rayyan Meziane won bronze in the men's 60 kg event.

Men

Women

Sailing

France won four medals in sailing.

Shooting

France won six medals in shooting.

Swimming

France won eight medals in swimming.

Taekwondo

France won three medals in Taekwondo.

 Legend
 PTG — Won by Points Gap
 SUP — Won by superiority
 OT — Won on over time (Golden Point)
 DQ — Won by disqualification
 PUN — Won by punitive declaration
 WD — Won by withdrawal

Men

Women

Volleyball

France competed in volleyball.

Water polo

Summary

Group play

Seventh place game

Weightlifting

France won one medal in weightlifting.

Men

Women

Wrestling

France won eight medals in wrestling.

References

Nations at the 2022 Mediterranean Games
2022
Mediterranean Games